Gadra Road railway station is a railway station in Barmer district, Rajasthan, India. It used to serve the town of Gadra which is now in Sind province of Pakistan. The station consists of two platforms. The platforms are not well sheltered, and lack facilities including water and sanitation.Country's first railway shaeed smarak is situated in Gadra Road (Munabao) ,Badmer district of Rajasthan. 

As the station and township of Gadra Road is close to the Pakistan border, it was subjected to shelling by the Pakistani army during the 1965 war. It's Memorials of indian railway victory.

Trains 
Some of the trains that run from Gadra are:
 Barmer–Munabao Passenger
 Munabao–Barmer Passenger

These are slow passenger trains which run once a day except on Sundays.

References

Railway stations in Barmer district
Jodhpur railway division